Sultan of Najd (Arabic: سلطان نجد) is a political economic novel by Abdullah Al-Salloum. The novel (Subtitled: The throne advocating for fair wealth distribution - Arabic: الحكم المناصر لعدالة توزيع الثروة) interprets –within the ancient Ukhaydhariya State– a series of events that exposed what was unknown by the throne, not only within the monetary scope, but the state politics, where the Emir gets introduced to reforming schemes meant to achieve the state’s sustainability. The title was ranked the third bestseller on Amazon's Arabic Literature and Fiction category.

External links 
 Title website

References 

Political novels
2017 novels
Arabic-language novels
History of Nejd